Yonatthan Nicolás Rak Barragán (born 18 August 1993) is a Uruguayan professional footballer who plays as a defender for Liga MX club Tijuana.

Career
Rak started his career with Uruguayan side Miramar Misiones, where he made 37 league appearances and scored three goals, but left due to financial problems.

In 2015, Rak was sent on loan to Internacional, one of the most successful clubs in Brazil.

Before the 2018 season, he signed for Uruguayan outfit Montevideo City Torque, where he received offers from Atlético Nacional, the most successful team in Colombia.

Career statistics

Club

References

External links
 
 

1993 births
Living people
Uruguayan people of Slavic descent
Uruguayan footballers
Expatriate footballers in Brazil
Uruguayan expatriate footballers
Montevideo City Torque players
Uruguayan Primera División players
Footballers from Montevideo
Miramar Misiones players
Association football defenders
Sport Club Internacional players
Uruguayan expatriates in Brazil